The Leslie Morrell Line Cabin and Corral are located in the Cathedral Valley section of northern Capitol Reef National Park in Utah. The cabin was built in the 1920s on Lake Creek by Paul Christensen at his sawmill as a summer residence for Christensen and his family.  Christensen sold the cabin to Leslie H. Morrell around 1935, who took the cabin apart and rebuilt it at its present site for use as a winter camp for cowboys on the Morrell ranch. The use continued until 1970 when the area was sold to the National Park Service. It is one of the best-preserved relics of ranching activities in the park.

The cabin was listed on the National Register of Historic Places on September 13, 1999.

References

Buildings and structures in Wayne County, Utah
Agricultural buildings and structures on the National Register of Historic Places in Utah
National Register of Historic Places in Capitol Reef National Park
Corrals
National Register of Historic Places in Wayne County, Utah